Paul II of Antioch may refer to:

Paul the Jew, Chalcedonian patriarch of Antioch from 519 to 521
Paul the Black, Miaphysite patriarch of Antioch from 564 to 581

See also
Paul I of Antioch